Niello may refer to:

Niello, a black mixture of metallic alloys, used as an inlay on engraved or etched metal.
Roger Niello (born 1948), American politician, representative in California State Assembly
Niello (rapper), Swedish rap and electronic hip hop artist